The 2009–10 season is the Wellington Phoenix's third season of football in the Hyundai A-League, making it the longest running New Zealand team in the competition, surpassing the defunct New Zealand Knights.

Players

First team squad

Transfers

In

Out

Matches

2009–10 Pre-season friendlies

2009–10 Hyundai A-League fixtures

2009–10 Finals series

Results by round

Statistics

Appearances

Goal scorers

Goal assists

Discipline

Goal times

Home attendance

Club

Technical staff
First team Coach:  Ricki Herbert
Goalkeeping Coach:  Jonathan Gould
Technical Analyst:  Luciano Trani
First team Physiotherapist:  Adam Crump
Masseur:  Dene Carroll
Strength & Conditioning Coach:  Ed Baranowski

Kit

The team kit for the 2009–10 season was produced by Reebok. The home kit was changed to a black and yellow vertically striped shirt with black shorts and socks. The away kit features black sleeves with yellow trim on a white background, while the shorts are white with a yellow and black side trim, with white socks. Sony renewed its contract with the Wellington Phoenix and remained the club's major sponsor.

|
|
|
|
|}

End of Season Awards
See also List of Wellington Phoenix FC End of Season Awards
Sony Player of the Year: Andrew Durante
Members' Player of the Year: Paul Ifill
Players' Player of the Year: Paul Ifill
Media Player of the Year: Paul Ifill
Golden Boot: Paul Ifill – 12 goals
Under-23 Player of the Year: Troy Hearfield

References

Wellington Phoenix FC seasons
Wellington Phoenix Season, 2009–10
Wellington Phoenix season